The Sella-class destroyers were a group of four destroyers built for the  (Royal Italian Navy) in the 1920s. Two of these ships fought in World War II and both were sunk after the Italian capitulation to the Allies. The two other ships were sold to the Swedish Navy in 1940 and were scrapped in the late 1940s.

These ships formed the basis for most subsequent destroyers built by the Italians, but were disappointing in service with unreliable machinery.

Design and description
The Sella-class destroyers were enlarged and improved versions of the preceding   and s. Their complement was 8–9 officers and 144 enlisted men.

The Sellas were powered by two Parsons geared steam turbines, each driving one propeller shaft using steam supplied by three Yarrow boilers.

Their main battery consisted of three  guns in one twin-gun turret aft of the superstructure and one single-gun turret forward of it. Anti-aircraft (AA) defense for the Sella-class ships was provided by a pair of  AA guns in single mounts amidships and a pair of  machine guns. They were equipped with four  torpedo tubes in two twin mounts amidships. The Sellas could also carry 32 mines.

Ships

Service history
During the war, the destroyers were based at the island of Leros, in the Dodecanese. Crispi led the landing of an Italian division on Sitia, Crete, on 28 May 1941, in the course of the battle of Crete.

Notes

Bibliography

External links
 Tragedy destroyer Quintino Sella 11 września 1943 r. (PL) 
 Quintino Sella Marina Militare website

Destroyer classes
 
Ships built in Italy